Bly Mountain Pass (el. 5087 ft.) is a mountain pass in Oregon traversed by Oregon Route 140.

External links
 tripcheck.com Bly Mountain Pass cam  from Oregon Department of Transportation

Mountain passes of Oregon
Landforms of Klamath County, Oregon